The Netherlands Football League Championship 1921–1922 was contested by 43 teams participating in four divisions. The national champion would be determined by a play-off featuring the winners of the eastern, northern, southern and western football division of the Netherlands. Go Ahead won this year's championship by beating Blauw-Wit Amsterdam, NAC, and Be Quick 1887.

New entrants
Eerste Klasse East:
Promoted from 2nd Division: Heracles

Eerste Klasse North:
Promoted from 2nd Division: Upright

Eerste Klasse South:
Promoted from 2nd Division: PSV Eindhoven

Eerste Klasse West:
Promoted from 2nd Division: Feijenoord (returning after two seasons of absence) & RCH

Divisions

Eerste Klasse East

Eerste Klasse North

Eerste Klasse South

Eerste Klasse West

Championship play-off

Play-off

Go Ahead won the championship.

References
RSSSF Netherlands Football League Championships 1898-1954
RSSSF Eerste Klasse Oost
RSSSF Eerste Klasse Noord
RSSSF Eerste Klasse Zuid
RSSSF Eerste Klasse West

Netherlands Football League Championship seasons
1921–22 in Dutch football
Netherlands